The Cook Islands elects a legislature on a national level. The Parliament of the Cook Islands has 24 members, elected for a four-year term in single-seat constituencies.  The Cook Islands has a two-party system, which means that there are two dominant political parties and it is extremely difficult for any other party to achieve electoral success.

An election was held on 14 June 2018. The Cook Islands Party lost its majority, winning only 10 of 24 seats, but Prime Minister Henry Puna was able to put together a coalition by offering cabinet positions to the One Cook Islands Movement's George Angene and independents Robert Tapaitau and Rose Toki-Brown.

Latest election

<onlyinclude>

By-elections

See also
 Electoral calendar
 Electoral system

References